Olszyny-Kolonia  is a village in the administrative district of Gmina Piątnica, within Łomża County, Podlaskie Voivodeship, in northeast Poland.

References

Olszyny-Kolonia